Lebanon competed at the 1980 Summer Olympics in Moscow, USSR. They entered 15 competitors, all men, who took part in 16 events in 8 sports.

Medalists

Bronze 
 Hassan Bchara — Wrestling, Men's Greco-Roman Super Heavyweight

Athletics

Men's 100 metres
 Roland Dagher
 Heat — 11.01 (→ did not advance)

Men's 200 metres
 Roland Dagher
 Heat — 22.27 (→ did not advance)

Men's Marathon
 Nabil Choueiri
 Final — did not finish (→ no ranking)

Boxing

Cycling

Two cyclists represented Lebanon in 1980.

Individual road race
 Salloum Kaysar
 Kamal Ghalayni

Fencing

Two fencers represented Lebanon in 1980.

Men's foil
 Dany Haddad
 Hassan Hamze

Men's épée
 Dany Haddad
 Hassan Hamze

Judo

Swimming

Men's 100m Freestyle
 Bilall Yamouth
 Heats — 1.03,48 (→ did not advance)

Men's 200m Freestyle
 Bilall Yamouth
 Heats — 2.27,94 (→ did not advance)

Weightlifting

Wrestling

References

External links
 Official Olympic Reports
 International Olympic Committee results database

Nations at the 1980 Summer Olympics
1980 Summer Olympics
1980 in Lebanese sport